Lorcan George Sherlock (5 June 1874 – 26 December 1945) was an Irish businessman and politician who served as Lord Mayor of Dublin from 1912 to 1915. He as a member of the Irish Parliamentary Party.

He was educated at the O'Connell School on North Richmond Street, Dublin. In 1897, he married Elizabeth Doyle, and they had two children. After her death, he married Catherine McEneaney in 1911, with whom he had a daughter.

In 1905, he was elected to Dublin Corporation, representing his local district, the Mountjoy ward. In 1912, he was elected Lord Mayor of Dublin and served three successive terms. He was the last Irish Parliamentary Party politician to serve as Lord Mayor. After the formation of the Irish Free State, Sherlock retired from politics.

References

1874 births
1945 deaths
Lord Mayors of Dublin
Businesspeople from Dublin (city)